Greg Maas (born January 19, 1966 in Portland, Oregon) is a retired U.S. soccer goalkeeper who spent his entire professional career in Portland. He was the head coach of the Utah Valley University men's soccer team, starting the program from scratch. The team begins play in 2014 and competes in the Western Athletic Conference (WAC). Utah Valley has the only NCAA Division I men's soccer program in the state of Utah. He now serves as an academy coach mentor and senior boys and girls director of goalkeeping for the Washington Timbers a founding member of the Portland Timbers Alliance.

Maas attended the University of Portland where he was a goalkeeper on the Pilot’s soccer team from 1984 to 1987 playing under one of the most respected coaches in U.S. Soccer history—the late Clive Charles. Maas was the first professional goalkeeper to come out of the University of Portland; during the 1985 collegiate off season, he began playing with F.C. Portland of the Western Soccer Alliance (WSA). He would continue to play for F.C. Portland until it changed its name to the Portland Timbers in 1989. He remained with the Timbers until the team folded at the end of the 1990 season. On a side note, the WSA merged with the American Soccer League in 1990 to form the American Professional Soccer League.

Since retiring from playing, Maas has held various youth soccer coaching positions. From 2001-2014 he served as the State Technical Director of Utah Youth Soccer Association and also served as the Real Salt Lake U-17 Head Coach from 2008-2012. Maas holds his USSF A License, USSF National Goalkeeper License, USSF National Youth License, and his NSCAA International Premier Diploma; he also serves as a National Staff Coach and Instructor with U.S. Soccer, US Youth Soccer, and the NSCAA. Maas has served over 20 years as a West Region ODP Staff Coach with US Youth Soccer, and is the current West Region ODP boys technical director. As the U-17 Head Coach for Real Salt Lake (RSL) of Major League Soccer, Maas garnered the 2008 MLS U-17 Cup Championship, finished 3rd in 2009, and were finalists in 2010 losing a hard-fought penalty shootout to DC United.  
 
Greg and his wife, Angie, have two boys, Cody and Zach, and currently reside in Vancouver, Wa.

External links
 RSL U-17 info
 Portland Timbers info
 Utah Youth Soccer Association info
 UVU Men's Soccer info

1966 births
Living people
American Professional Soccer League players
American soccer coaches
American soccer players
Association football goalkeepers
Portland Pilots men's soccer players
Portland Timbers (1985–1990) players
Real Salt Lake non-playing staff
Soccer players from Oregon
University of Portland alumni
Utah Valley Wolverines men's soccer coaches
Western Soccer Alliance players